Nicolás Andrés Burdisso (born 12 April 1981) is an Argentine football manager and former professional player who played as a centre back.

Burdisso began his career with Boca Juniors. Here, he won Argentine Championships, three Copa Libertadores and two Intercontinental Cups. In 2004, he was sold to Italian club Inter Milan, winning four Serie A titles, a Coppa Italia and Supercoppa Italiana. In 2009, he moved to Roma, and later Genoa and Torino.

A former Argentina international, he made 49 appearances since his debut in 2003. He was selected for two FIFA World Cups and two Copa Americas and was part of the team which won gold at the 2004 Summer Olympics.

Nicolás Burdisso was manager of Boca Juniors in 2019 and will have his second experience as a manager: Fiorentina has hired him to start next season.

Club career

Boca Juniors
Burdisso is the product of Argentine club Boca Juniors's youth system. He began his professional career with them in 1999 at age 18. With Boca Juniors, he won two Argentine Championships (2000 Apertura and 2003 Apertura), three Copa Libertadores (2000, 2001, 2003), and two Intercontinental Cups (2000, 2003).

Internazionale
In 2004, Burdisso moved to Internazionale of Serie A, signing a four-year contract. However, he missed almost all of the 2004–05 season after Inter allowed him to return to Argentina to support his daughter Angela who was fighting leukemia. He returned to action in October 2005 when he played as a second-half substitute in the 5–0 hammering of Livorno. On 31 August 2006, he extended his contract until 2009. On 8 September 2006, four days after Giacinto Facchetti died, Burdisso was given the number 16 jersey for the retirement of Facchetti's beloved number 3 jersey.

Burdisso enjoyed his most prolific campaign during the 2006–07, when he was named the Coppa Italia top scorer with 4 goals jointly with four other players. This also included his first career brace on 29 November 2006 in the 4–0 victory against Messina. He again scored twice on 24 January 2007, in the 3–0 victory against Sampdoria. Inter eventually made their way to the final, where they faced Roma; Burdisso played in the second leg which Inter won 2–1, but they lost the trophy 7–4 on aggregate. In addition to that, he also scored two goals in the championship which ended in conquest.

During the Champions League tie between Valencia and Inter on 5 March 2007, a fracas broke out between players of the two teams. Burdisso suffered a broken nose from a punch in the face from Valencia defender David Navarro. As punishment for his part in the brawl, Burdisso was handed a six-match ban from all European club competitions, with an additional two match suspension. Navarro was sentenced to a seven-month ban from domestic, European and international matches. The match at Mestalla Stadium ended in a goalless draw which sent Inter out of competition on away goal rule.

Burdisso eventually returned to duty on 12 March 2008 in the second leg of the Champions League match against Liverpool, but was sent off in the 60th minute after receiving his second yellow card of the game. With Inter, he played left and right back and central defender as a key member of the squad in three different competitions.

Burdisso left the club in August 2009 after playing 139 matches and scoring 8 goals in all competitions, winning 9 trophies in the process.

Roma

On 22 August 2009, Burdisso was signed by Roma on loan, which offered him €3.04 million (gross) salary per year. He played the opening match of the league on 23 August. He scored his first goal for Roma on 20 December 2009, opening the scoring in a 2–0 win over Parma.

Burdisso was then signed by Roma permanently on 28 August 2010 for an €8 million transfer fee. He signed a four-year contract, in which he would earn €3.8 million (pre-tax) his first year, increasing to €4.5 million pre-tax in the next three years.

He scored his fifth goal—first in the 2011–12 Serie A—for Roma against Milan on 29 October. Roma lost that game 3–2. On 15 November 2011, he suffered a serious injury to his left knee which will force him out of action for six months.

In 2007, Burdisso expressed his desire to finish his career at Boca Juniors.

In 2012–13 season under Zdeněk Zeman, Burdisso was relegated to the bench. He played only eight matches in the first part of the season, scoring the opener in a 4–2 win over Milan. Prospects in the starting XI remained dismal after the arrival of new manager Rudi Garcia, typically serving as third-choice centre-back behind starters Mehdi Benatia and Leandro Castán.

Genoa
On 23 January 2014, Burdisso signed with Genoa. He played for Genoa for four seasons, making 113 appearances.

Torino

On 31 August 2017, Burdisso was signed by Torino on a free transfer on an annual contract. He concluded the season with 25 appearances for Torino.

He announced his retirement on 10 October 2018.

International career

Burdisso starred in the Argentina under-20 team along with Javier Saviola and Maxi Rodríguez. All three won the 2001 FIFA World Youth Championship together.

On 15 May 2006, Burdisso was named as a squad member for the 2006 FIFA World Cup by his former U-20 coach José Pekerman, going on to play in all three group matches. He also played for Argentina in the Copa América 2007, where the team went on to reach the final.

On 4 June 2008, Burdisso scored his second goal for Argentina during a friendly against Mexico in San Diego, California. Burdisso was selected to the Argentina squad for the 2010 World Cup by manager Diego Maradona and for the Copa América 2011 by manager Sergio Batista.

On 15 November 2011, Burdisso injured his left knee during a World Cup qualifying match against Colombia. During a disputed ball with James Rodríguez, Burdisso partially tore his left knee ligaments, with initial assessments predicting a recovery period of six-to-eight months.

Personal life
Burdisso has a younger brother, Guillermo Burdisso, who is currently playing for Deportivo Cali, had previously played for Roma as well. The Burdisso brothers hold Italian passports due to their family origins in Collegno (Turin) and Revello (Cuneo), their grandparents' birthplaces in the Italian region of Piedmont.

After retirement
Retiring in the summer 2018, it was confirmed at the end of December 2018, that Burdisso had been appointed sporting director of his former club, Boca Juniors, signing a deal until December 2020. However, he resigned from the position at the end of 2019.

On 6 July 2021, Burdisso was appointed technical director of ACF Fiorentina.

Career statistics

Club

International 
International goals

Scores and results list Argentina's goal tally first.

Honours
Boca Juniors
Argentine Primera División: Apertura 2000, Apertura 2003
Copa Libertadores: 2000, 2001, 2003
Intercontinental Cup: 2000, 2003

Internazionale
Serie A: 2005–06, 2006–07, 2007–08, 2008–09
Coppa Italia: 2005–06, 2006-07 (Runners up)
Argentina Youth 
FIFA U-20 World Cup: 2001
CONMEBOL Men Pre-Olympic Tournament: 2004
Gold Medal at the Summer Olympics: 2004 Athens
Individual
Coppa Italia top-scorer: 2006–07

References

External links

Official Website (nicolasburdisso.com)
Stats and profile (footballdatabase.com)
inter.it profile

1981 births
Living people
Sportspeople from Córdoba Province, Argentina
Argentine people of Italian descent
Argentine footballers
Association football central defenders
Boca Juniors footballers
Inter Milan players
A.S. Roma players
Genoa C.F.C. players
Torino F.C. players
Serie A players
Argentina international footballers
Argentina under-20 international footballers
Footballers at the 2004 Summer Olympics
Olympic footballers of Argentina
Olympic gold medalists for Argentina
2006 FIFA World Cup players
2007 Copa América players
2011 Copa América players
Argentine Primera División players
Argentine expatriate footballers
Expatriate footballers in Italy
2010 FIFA World Cup players
Argentine expatriate sportspeople in Italy